Laurent N'Dri Pokou (10 August 1947 – 13 November 2016) was an Ivorian footballer who played as a striker. He notably played for French club Stade Rennais F.C.

International career
Pokou was a member of the Ivorian national team, who was twice the highest goalscorer of the Africa Cup of Nations, scoring six goals in the 1968 tournament in Ethiopia and eight in the 1970 edition in Sudan, including five in one match against Ethiopia, which Ivory Coast won 6–1. This performance gave him his nickname L'homme d'Asmara (the man of Asmara). With 14 total goals, he is also the tournament's second highest overall goalscorer, behind Cameroon's Samuel Eto'o, who eclipsed Pokou's record in the 2008 ACN tournament.

References

External links
 
 Laurent N'Dri Pokou - Goals in International Matches

1947 births
2016 deaths
Footballers from Abidjan
Association football forwards
Ivorian footballers
Ivory Coast international footballers
1968 African Cup of Nations players
1970 African Cup of Nations players
1974 African Cup of Nations players
1980 African Cup of Nations players
Ligue 1 players
ASEC Mimosas players
Stade Rennais F.C. players
AS Nancy Lorraine players
Ivorian expatriate footballers
Ivorian expatriate sportspeople in France
Expatriate footballers in France